Hans-Peter Schär (born 14 April 1936) is a Swiss former footballer who played in the 1950s and 1960s. He played as a forward.

Schär joined FC Basel's first team for their 1954–55 season under player-coach René Bader. Schär only played for the club this one season. He played his domestic league debut for the club in the home game at the Landhof on 12th of December 1954 as Basel drew 1–1 with the Young Boys.

During his one season with the club, Schär played three games for Basel. Two of these games were in the Nationalliga A, the other was a friendly game. The afore mentioned test match was on 17 February 1955 against local team FC Liestal. In this test game Schär scored four goals and Basel won by seven goals to one.

Following his time with FC Basel Schär moved on to play for Nordstern Basel, who at that time played in the second tier in Swiss football. He later joined Servette.

References

Sources
 Rotblau: Jahrbuch Saison 2017/2018. Publisher: FC Basel Marketing AG. 
 Die ersten 125 Jahre. Publisher: Josef Zindel im Friedrich Reinhardt Verlag, Basel. 
 Verein "Basler Fussballarchiv" Homepage

FC Basel players
FC Nordstern Basel players
Swiss men's footballers
Association football forwards
1936 births
Living people